Valazjerd (also Romanized as Valāzjerd, Vālāzjerd, and Velāzjerd; also known as Waliajigār and Zejerd) is a village in Khosrow Beyk Rural District, Milajerd District, Komijan County, Markazi Province, Iran. At the 2006 census, its population was 59, in 20 families.

References 

Populated places in Komijan County